Geneseo Township may refer to:

 Geneseo Township, Henry County, Illinois
 Geneseo Township, Cerro Gordo County, Iowa
 Geneseo Township, Tama County, Iowa
 Geneseo Township, Roberts County, South Dakota, in Roberts County, South Dakota

See also
 Genesee Township (disambiguation)

Township name disambiguation pages